Siyyan Himar or Rocher Moulhele is a pair of small islands, about 100 m apart and rising only 1.8 m above sea level, located about 3.8 km off the coast of Djibouti and 4.4 km northeast of the Siyyan peninsula, in the Bab-el-Mandeb strait (between the Red Sea and the Gulf of Aden).  They are an uplifted ridge of a fossil coral reef.

See also
 Rocher Siyyan, an islet about 5.5 km south of Siyyan Himar

References

Islands of Djibouti